The Departmental Council of Val-de-Marne is the deliberative assembly of the Val-de-Marne department in the region of Île-de-France. It consists of 50 members (general councilors) from 25 cantons and its headquarters are in Créteil.

The President of the General Council is Olivier Capitanio.

Vice-Presidents 
The President of the Departmental Council is assisted by 15 vice-presidents chosen from among the departmental advisers. Each of them has a delegation of authority.

References

See also 

 Val-de-Marne
 General councils of France
 Departmental Council of Val-de-Marne (official website)

Val-de-Marne
Val-de-Marne